Terry Donald Coe is a Niuean politician and former cabinet minister.  He is a member of the Niue Assembly, elected from the common roll.

Coe served as a minister in the Cabinet of Premier Frank Lui between 1993 and 1999, being responsible for Telecoms, Meteorology, the Electrical Power Corporation, the Public Works Department, Administration and Agriculture, Forestry and Fisheries.  He lost his portfolio after Lui was defeated in the 1999 election and has since become a key member of the country's opposition.

After the 1999 election, Coe supported O'Love Jacobsen for premier.

In 2002, he was unsuccessfully prosecuted for criminal libel by the government.  The charges were dismissed after police failed to produce any evidence.

In 2011, he criticised his fellow MPs for voting themselves a sizeable increase in salary. He said the pay rises for politicians were a waste of public money that “would be better spent on development”.

References

Living people
Members of the Niue Assembly
Year of birth missing (living people)
Government ministers of Niue